Arantxa Echevarría Carcedo (born 1968) is a Spanish filmmaker and television producer.

Biography 
Arantxa Echevarría Carcedo was born in 1968 in Bilbao. She studied a degree in Sciences of the Image and a specialization in audiovisual production at the Complutense University of Madrid, and pursued further studies at Sydney Community College. She has worked in cinema and television since 1991.

Her short film De noche y de pronto earned a nomination to the Goya Award for Best Fictional Short Film.

Her feature debut Carmen & Lola (2018) earned her the Goya Award for Best New Director, past her fifties. It was followed by her second feature The Perfect Family (2021). She also directed one episode of El Cids first season. In 2022, she began shooting her third feature, Chinas.

References 

1968 births
Spanish women screenwriters
Spanish women film directors
21st-century Spanish screenwriters
People from Bilbao
Living people